Moacir Zimmermann (born 30 December 1983) is a Brazilian race walker. He competed in the men's 20 kilometres walk at the 2016 Summer Olympics. In 2019, he competed in the men's 20 kilometres walk at the 2019 World Athletics Championships held in Doha, Qatar. He finished in 39th place.

References

1983 births
Living people
Brazilian male racewalkers
Olympic athletes of Brazil
Athletes (track and field) at the 2016 Summer Olympics
Universiade medalists in athletics (track and field)
People from Foz do Iguaçu
Universiade bronze medalists for Brazil
Athletes (track and field) at the 2019 Pan American Games
Pan American Games athletes for Brazil
Medalists at the 2009 Summer Universiade
Medalists at the 2011 Summer Universiade
Sportspeople from Paraná (state)
21st-century Brazilian people
20th-century Brazilian people